Praenetus or Prainetos, also known as Prinetos or Prinetus (Πρίνετος) was a town of ancient Bithynia on the coast of the Propontis. It on the north side of Mount Arganthonius (Samanli Daği), and at the southern entrance of the Sinus Astacenus. It was situated 28 Roman miles to the northwest of Nicaea. Stephanus of Byzantium calls it Pronectus or Pronektos (Πρόνεκτος) and states that it was founded by the Phoenicians. If this be true, it would be a very ancient place, which can scarcely be conceived, as it is mentioned only by very late writers. According to Cedrenus it was destroyed by an earthquake. It was a bishopric; no longer the seat of a residential bishop, it remains a titular see of the Roman Catholic Church.

Its site is located near Karamürsel, in Asiatic Turkey.

References

Populated places in Bithynia
Former populated places in Turkey
History of Kocaeli Province
Catholic titular sees in Asia